Nausikaa Lake is a lake in geographic Lee Township in the Unorganized West Part of Timiskaming District, in northeastern Ontario, Canada. The lake is in the Saint Lawrence River drainage basin and the nearest community is Sesekinika,  to the east. It is named for Nausicaa, a Greek princess in Homer's Odyssey.

There is one unnamed inflow at the northwest. The primary outflow, at the northeast, is an unnamed creek that flows to Lillord Creek. Lillord Creek flows via the Blanche River, Lake Timiskaming and the Ottawa River to the Saint Lawrence River.

References

Other map sources:

Lakes of Timiskaming District